The anime series Chrono Crusade premiered in Japan on Fuji TV on November 23, 2003 and ran for twenty-four episodes until its series finale on June 10, 2004. Produced by Gonzo Digimation, the series is adapted from the first three volumes of the eight-volume manga series of the same name by Daisuke Moriyama across the first thirteen episodes. The remainder of the series is primarily an original story line that occasionally still pulls from the source manga, which was incomplete at the time the anime series finished.

The anime was licensed for release in North America by ADV Films. The company's English dub of the series was broadcast in the United States on Showtime Beyond from February 17, 2006 through July 28, 2006. ADV released the episodes across seven individual DVD volumes before releasing the entire series in a single box set collection. This collection was voted best anime of 2004. Funimation Entertainment later licensed Chrono Crusade after ADV Film's license expired, and is re-releasing it to DVD in February 2011. Chrono Crusade was broadcast on Syfy beginning on February 22, 2011.

The series uses two pieces of theme music. , by Minami Kuribayashi, is used for the series' opening theme while Saeko Chiba's  is used for the ending theme.

Episode listing

See also
 List of Chrono Crusade chapters

References

External links
 

Chrono Crusade